Chimila may refer to:

 Chimila people, an ethnic group of Colombia
 Chimila language, a language of Colombia
 Chimila (wasp), a genus of wasps

See also 
 Chimillas, a municipality of Spain